Franklin J. Moses may refer to:

Franklin J. Moses Sr. (1804–1877), Chief Justice of the South Carolina Supreme Court from 1868 to 1877
Franklin J. Moses Jr. (1838–1906), Governor of South Carolina from 1872 to 1874, son of the above